The Olympia Gold Classic was a women's professional golf tournament on the LPGA Tour, held in southern California in Los Angeles County from 1978 to 1982. It was played in late winter at the Rancho Park Golf Course in the city of Los Angeles from 1978 to 1980 as the "Sunstar Classic," then moved east to Industry Hills Golf Club in City of Industry in 1981 and 1982, in a renamed event sponsored by Olympia Brewing Company.

History
Nancy Lopez, age 21, won the inaugural edition by a stroke for her second career win; she won her first at the previous tournament in Florida two weeks earlier and won nine times in 1978, including five consecutive in late spring. Lopez successfully defended the title in 1979, sinking a  birdie putt on the final hole to edge Hollis Stacy by a stroke.

The last three editions were hampered by heavy rains; 1980 was 54 holes as the first round was washed out, and 1981 was reduced to 36 holes with no weekend  The next year it went the full 72 holes, but the final round was postponed a day to Monday. Sally Little was the champion the last two years. 

It was not succeeded by any event in the Los Angeles area in 1983.

Tournament names
 Olympia Gold Classic – (1981–1982), at Industry Hills Golf Club in City of Industry
 Sunstar Classic – (1978–1980), at Rancho Park Golf Course in Los Angeles

Winners

Due to heavy rain, final round in 1982 was held on Monday; no weekend rounds in 1981, and no opening round in 1980.

References

External links
Industry Hills Golf Club
Rancho Park Golf Club

Former LPGA Tour events
Golf in California
Sports competitions in Los Angeles County, California
Recurring sporting events established in 1978
Recurring events disestablished in 1982
Women's sports in California